Zoarces elongatus, also known as the eastern viviparous blenny is an eelpout in the family Zoarcidae, described by Rudolf Kner in 1868. The species is endemic to the Northwest Pacific, in such areas as the Sea of Japan and the Sea of Okhotsk and China.

References

External links
 Zoarces elongatus at Encyclopedia of Life.
 Zoarces elongatus at World Register of Marine Species.

elongatus
Fish described in 1868
Taxa named by Rudolf Kner
Viviparous fish
Fish of the Pacific Ocean
Fish of Asia
Fish of Russia
Fish of Japan
Fish of China